Rallycross is a form of sprint style automobile racing, held on a closed mixed-surface racing circuit, with modified production or specially built road cars, similar to the World Rally Cars.  It is mainly popular in the Nordic countries, the Netherlands, Belgium, France and Great Britain. An inexpensive, entry level type of rallycross is the Swedish folkrace or its Norwegian counterpart, the so-called bilcross. The folkrace is most popular in Finland where it was founded back in the late 1960s. In Europe, rallycross can also refer to racing 1:8 scale off-road radio-controlled buggies.

History

Origins of rallycross

The sport started as a TV show (with especially invited rally drivers), produced by Robert Reed of ABC Weekend TV for ITV's World of Sport programme, at Lydden Circuit (between Dover and Canterbury) in Great Britain on Saturday, 4 February 1967. The first true rallycross was organised by Bud Smith (d. 1994) and the Tunbridge Wells Centre of the 750 MC, with the aid of Lydden Circuit owner Bill Chesson (d. 1999), and was won by later Formula One driver as well as 1968 Rally Monte Carlo winner Vic Elford in a showroom Porsche 911 of the British importer AFN, ahead of Brian Melia in his Ford Lotus Cortina and Tony Fall in a BMC Mini Cooper S.

After that inaugural event there were another two test rallycrosses at Lydden, on 11 March and 29 July, before the new World of Sport Rallycross Championship for the ABC TV viewers started with round one on 23 September, to be followed by round two on 7 October. The series was run over a total of six rounds (three at Lydden and three at Croft) and was eventually won by Englishman Tony Chappell (Ford Escort Twin Cam), who became the first British Rallycross champion after winning the final round of the new series on 6 April 1968 at Lydden.

However, the true birth of rallycross is often wrongly connected with the cancellation of the 1967 RAC Rally, due to foot-and-mouth disease, in November 1967, about ten months after the maiden event. Some foreign entrants for the RAC had also planned to take part in the 1st international rallycross at Lydden Circuit, on Saturday, 25 November 1967, but went home immediately after the rally had been cancelled on the evening of 17 November, and was replaced by a single special stage (won by Swede Erik Carlsson in a Saab 96 V4) for the sake of the disappointed television companies. RAC Rally stage number one by then, Camberley, was on Ministry of Defence land and not affected by movement restrictions caused by the disease in rural areas. Subsequently, only British drivers competed in the maiden international rallycross event one week later, which was eventually won by Andrew Cowan and his Hillman Imp. Thames Estuary Automobile Club's (TEAC) premier event, the original Clubman's rallycross, was held the day after. It opened up the new rally drivers' fun-sport to many amateur competitors, proved very successful and thereby paved the way for the first generation of real rallycross specialists, many of them coming from the ranges of autocross and autograss racing.

After one and a half years and several rallycross events at Lydden as well as Croft Circuit (near Darlington) the BBC adopted the young sport for its Grandstand programme while ITV dropped it after the British Rallycross Winter Series 1968/69. In 1969 Lydden Circuit and Croft Circuit were joined by another RX venue, Cadwell Park in Lincolnshire. However, while both Lydden and Croft nowadays are still in use for rallycross Cadwell Park later dropped this type of car racing from its schedule.

Expansion to the Netherlands
Rob Herzet (AVRO), a Dutch counterpart to Robert Reed, discovered rallycross during a visit to Great Britain in 1968 and immediately understood its potential for the television viewers. By that time there were nearly ten million Britons watching some of the events on television. Back home in the Netherlands, Herzet contacted the race and rally driver as well as motoring journalist Gerard van Lennep (a cousin to Formula One driver Gijs van Lennep) to discuss his find. Both agreed that this form of sprint racing could be also appropriate for the Netherlands. Van Lennep soon started his investigations and found a military testing ground near the town of Venlo, close to the Dutch-German border. Actually there had been two venues available, the one at Venlo in Limburg and one at Elst in Gelderland, but the aid offered by the army turned the decision into the favour of Venlo.

On Saturday 17 May 1969 a group of invited rally and racing drivers went to the spot for a test day. Everybody was really satisfied and enthusiastic and only three weeks later, on Saturday 7 June the first rallycross event on the European continent was held. The track consisted of a section of concrete runway, loose sections through heathland and a hollow, about 40 metres long and 10 metres deep, usually used for tank testing. Although the soft heath soil and the muddy hollow hampered most of the two dozen or so competitors, or at least their mostly rather aged cars, the event produced much fun for all concerned as well as the TV audience. Overall victory went eventually to Hans Kok and his valuable NSU 1200 TT.

The Dutch television company AVRO gave green light to Rob Herzet as well as another three rounds counting towards the so-called AVRO-Trophy and on 16 August of the same year NSU campaigner Hans Kok claimed the first national Dutch rallycross title. On Oktober 4 1969 Holland saw its last Rallycross event of the first season, a stand-alone one-off race organised on a temporary track that was quickly set up on pastureland near the ‘Europahal’ at the town of Elst, halfway between Arnhem and Nijmegen. Here it was young Briton ‘Jumping’ Jeff Wiliamson who drove his Riley 1300 to overall victory. On 1 November the Dutch Rallycross Association was founded and, during 1970, organised another five events at Venlo. For 1971 the Nederlandse Rallycross Vereniging (NRV) moved the sport to its new continental home at Valkenswaard near Eindhoven. The Eurocircuit opened on Saturday 17 April with a race that was won by Jan de Rooy and his famous DAF 555 Coupé 4WD and became the first track in the World that was especially designed and built purely for rallycross purposes.

Expansion to Australia
Rallycross came to Australia in 1969 with a one off meeting at Leppington in New South Wales. Events were held at Calder Park Raceway in Melbourne until the mid 1970s and at the Catalina Park circuit in Katoomba in New South Wales from 1972 until the early 1980s. Circuits at Towac near Orange in New South Wales as well as Tailem Bend and Whyalla in South Australia were also used, but after a dozen or so years the sport faded in Australia. Peter Brock was especially successful driving for the Holden Dealer Team in a supercharged Holden Torana GTR.

The inaugural Australian Rallycross Championship was held at the Tailem Bend circuit on 24 June 1979 and was won by Larry Perkins, driving a 2.0-litre Volkswagen Beetle for Kruger Motors. This was the only Australian Rallycross Championship to be contested.

A national rallycross championship was set to return to Australia in 2015 in the form of the Extreme Rallycross Championship, originally scheduled to consist of seven events held across 2015 and 2016. However, the series was cancelled after just one event had been held due to a lack of entries. A proposed Victorian championship, titled Rallycross Australia, was also cancelled before a single event had been run.

Soviet Union 
In Soviet Union history of rallycross (under name of autocross) goes back to 1949 when first competitions were held for light trucks, as well as passenger cars. First competitions resembled more light offroad race over 20-40km course, but over time races shortened and purpose built tracks were established. In 1970s and 1980s autocross was among most popular autosport disciplines in Soviet Union with hundreds of racing tracks and various classes of trucks, light cars and purpose built buggies competing. Most classes were effectively one-make classes, with few performance upgrades available, which together with wide state support made autocross popular and easily accessible to enthusiasts. Since late 1970s local regulations for autocross were harmonized with FIA regulations for rallycross. Until that time most tracks were unpaved, since then more partially paved rallycross tracks were built.

In the United States
In October 2009 Rally America (for two years operating under the tag RallyCar) announced it would begin sanctioning European style rallycross events in the United States. The inaugural season of the RallyCar Rallycross Championship, held in 2010, featured four events and several rally, rallycross and drifting competitors have shown an interest in contesting these races. All four events (August 29, October 3, November 6, November 7) were organised at New Jersey Motorsports Park.

A closed-format circuit race called Rallycross was a regular event at the X Games for some years. It was first added to the X Games XVI in 2010 under the name SuperRally. This event involved heavily modified production cars with turbocharged engines running at 600 BHP, all-wheel drive, sequential gearboxes, and offroad style suspension tuned for long jumps.

The Global RallyCross Championship was a Red Bull-sponsored championship that began in 2011 with five rounds in Irwindale, California (The Revolution), Snoqualmie, WA (Twin Peaks), Fountain, CO (Last Chance) and X Games 17 in the streets of Downtown Los Angeles. The series had several popular drivers such as Tanner Foust, Ken Block, Travis Pastrana, Finn Marcus Grönholm, Kiwi Rhys Millen, Dave Mirra, Frenchman Stéphane Verdier, Swede Michael Jernberg and Briton Liam Doran. The events were televised on ESPN. In 2012, the series grew to seven events run in conjunction with NASCAR Sprint Cup and IndyCar weekends as well as X Games 18 in Los Angeles. Several marques fielded factory- or importer-supported efforts including Ford, Hyundai, Subaru and Dodge. In 2013 the series went to Foz do Iguaçu, Brazil, and Munich, Germany, and a rained-out event in Barcelona, Spain. GRC Lites made their debut in Loudon, New Hampshire.

In 2018, the Circuit of the Americas in Austin, Texas, hosted the World Rallycross race event on September 29–30 at the purpose-built track.

The Americas Rallycross Championship began competition in 2018. However, it was cancelled after the 2019 season due to a lack of sponsors.

Pastrana launched his own rallycross championship Nitro Rallycross in 2021.

In the United Kingdom
The Motorsport UK British Rallycross Championship presented by Cooper Tires is the current national series in the United Kingdom. The calendar features iconic rallycross circuits including Lydden Hill Race Circuit. Recognised as an official championship by the MSUK, the governing body of motorsport in Great Britain. See rallycrossbrx.com for more information.

FIA European Rallycross Championship and FIA World Rallycross Championship

The first FIA World Rallycross Championship (World RX) took place from 4–5 May 2014, alongside the FIA European Rallycross Championship (Euro RX), the latter formerly known as FIA European Championships for Rallycross Drivers. Former World Rally Championship champion Petter Solberg took first place to become the first FIA World Rallycross Championship winner.

The 2014 FIA World Rallycross Championship consists of 12 events globally for the Supercar category. (See rallycrossrx.com for more info).

FIA World and European Rallycross Championship cars are built based on production car body shells of vehicles homologated for Group A and Group N, or permitted by a special FIA list for non-homologated cars to be used in rallycross, but are extensively modified.

Race format
Different rallycross championships and events use different formats and scoring systems. For information on the scoring system of the FIA World Rallycross Championship visit rallycrossrx.com.

Electric rallycross
The FIA made changes to rallycross categories before the beginning of 2021 season. The Supercar category was renamed to RX1, and a new electric rallycross supercar category RX1e was introduced. The Junior RX2 series were dropped, and Junior electric series RX2e were introduced. RX1e championship is expected to debut in 2022 season, consisting of the RX1 supercars retrofitted with two 250kW electric motors (equivalent of 680 horsepower), and equipped with 52kWh performance battery.

Similar types of racing

In Australia and in the United States, there are the dirt track racing, close to rallycross, but with two big differences, the vehicles are sprint cars, late models, modifieds and midgets instead, and they usually run in oval dirt tracks.

In Great Britain, they have the British autocross where some of the pioneers of rallycross started. In other Europeans countries there is the autocross, similar to British one, but with the cars starting the race at the same time, like in rallycross. Also there is the crosskart racing.

The motocross, which is similar to rallycross, but with motorcycles, ATVs and Pit bikes is very popular worldwide. It also have the bike motocross and the side car motocross.

In France, they have camion cross, (truck cross in English) similar to rallycross, but with trucks instead. The most known championship is the Coupe de France de camion cross.

See also

 Crosskart
 FIA Autocross
 Motocross
 BMX
 Truck cross
 Dirt track racing

References

 
Auto racing by type
Sports originating in England